North Rustico is a Canadian town located in Queens County, Prince Edward Island.

Situated on the north shore, North Rustico an incorporated municipality in 1954. North Rustico changed its status to a town on November 16, 2013. The town is known to locals, as well as many others as "The Crick". Its population as of the 2021 Census was 648 people.

North Rustico is well known for its Canada Day celebration every year on July 1. The event usually attracts in excess of 10,000 people, which packs the town quite full. It includes festivities in the park, a parade down main street, as well as a boat parade on Rustico Harbour. The celebration is popular among families, teenagers and adults. The day is completed by a fireworks display over the bay.

History
The village of North Rustico was founded circa 1790, around a small natural harbour along the Gulf of St. Lawrence coast. The region was home to a remnant Acadian population who fled British capture and deportation during the Seven Years' War (see Great Upheaval), although English, Scottish and Irish settlers moved into the area during the remainder of the 18th century and throughout the 19th and 20th centuries.

The name Rustico comes from Rassicot, the name of one of the first settlers from France.

The Farmers' Bank of Rustico in nearby South Rustico was founded and managed under the leadership of Father Georges-Antoine Belcourt, and received Royal Assent for its act of incorporation at the Court of Windsor on April 7, 1864. It is often considered to have been the first community-based bank in Canada.  The bank building was designated a National Historic Site of Canada in 1959.

Demographics 

Economy

North Rustico's primary industries are fishing, tourism and agriculture.

Since the 1996 census, the town has witnessed a population decline of 2% in year-round residents. During the short summer tourist season on Prince Edward Island in July and August, the village's proximity to the Prince Edward Island National Park results in a temporary population expansion, with many visitors staying in nearby accommodations.

The town has 344 dwellings.  In 2015, the median household income was $49,920, compared with the provincial average of $61,163. Many seasonal homes or cottages are owned by non-residents and are occupied for only several weeks during the summer months.

The fishing industry remains the village's most important economic activity, with approximately 40 vessels home-ported in a small craft harbour. Lobster fishing is the main focus for much of the fleet and during May and June fresh north shore P.E.I lobster can be bought in a fish market on the harbour wharves or directly off of the boats. "Fisherman's Wharf Lobster Suppers", the "Blue Mussel Cafe" and "The Yellow House Take-Out" are popular places to enjoy the fresh seafood of Prince Edward Island.

In the summer, this town is one of the Island's most popular destinations. On a warm summer evening, dozens of people can be found strolling the town's waterfront boardwalk, which overlooks the bay and fishing docks.

Tourism

North Rustico offers sea kayaking, cycling, walking, deep sea fishing, skating, boating, and hiking.

Sports 
North Star arena is home to a number of different hockey organizations, allowing players of all ages to exercise and enjoy the game of hockey.

Climate 
Similar to other Maritime provinces, Rustico's weather can be somewhat unpredictable. Winter temperatures run from -3 to -11, Autumn temperatures run from 8-22, Summer temperatures run around 20, and Spring temperatures run from 8 to 22 degrees.

Education 
Gulf Shore Consolidated School provides public education for students from Kindergarten to grade 9. French language education is available at Ecole Saint-Augustin, located near South Rustico.

References

External links

Populated places established in 1790
Communities in Queens County, Prince Edward Island
Towns in Prince Edward Island
1790 establishments in the British Empire
1790 establishments in North America